Gav Zard (also Romanized as Gāv Zard; also known as Gāhdar, Gāh Zard, Gazak, Gāzard, Geh Zard, and Gezak) is a village in Liravi-ye Shomali Rural District, in the Central District of Deylam County, Bushehr Province, Iran. At the 2006 census, its population was 216, in 43 families.

References 

Populated places in Deylam County